In the Fishtank 7 features Low and Dirty Three.

In November 1999 Konkurrent invited Low to record one of Konk's in house Fishtank-sessions. Low, being familiar with the series, accepted. In the spirit of 'In The Fishtank' Low took things a step further and extended the invitation to their friends Dirty Three to collaborate on the session which took place when both bands played the Crossing Border Festival in Amsterdam.

Track listing
 "I Hear… Goodnight"
 "Down by the River"
 "Invitation Day"
 "When I Called Upon Your Seed"
 "Cody"
 "Lordy"

External links
Konkurrent

In the Fishtank 07
07
Split EPs
In the Fishtank 7
In the Fishtank 7
In the Fishtank 7